"Playa's Only" is the second official single by R. Kelly from his album TP.3 Reloaded. It features The Game and samples his song "How We Do". The song was written, produced, and arranged by Kelly and Scott Storch.

Charts

Weekly charts

References

2005 singles
2005 songs
R. Kelly songs
The Game (rapper) songs
Jive Records singles
Song recordings produced by Scott Storch
Songs written by R. Kelly
Songs written by The Game (rapper)
Music videos directed by Director X
Songs written by Scott Storch